Kanjirappally is a taluk and a town in Kottayam district situated about  away from the district capital, in the state of Kerala, India.

Climate
Kanjirappally has the highest number of rainy days in Kerala. It receives the highest amount of summer rains, winter rains and northeast monsoons (Thulaam Mazha) in Kerala, making it one of the very few places in India enjoying equatorial rainforest type climate, with no distinct dry season. The well-distributed rainfall pattern of Kanjirappally is the primary reason for the phenomenon of high yield of latex from Rubber plantations in and around the town. The average annual rainfall is 4156 mm.

Transportation
National Highway (old NH 220 Kollam - Theni now NH 183) connects Kanjirapally to major nearest cities.

The K. K. Road (NH 183: Kollam-Theni) (Kottayam-Kumily Road) connects Kanjirapally to major nearest cities like Mundakkayam, Kottayam, Kuttikkanam, Kumily and Kattappana.

Pamba - Chemmalamattam - Erattupetta - Neriyamangalam (SH44) connects Kanjirapally to Sabarimala, Erumely, Pamba, Erattupetta and Thodupuzha.
Main Eastern Highway (Muvattupuzha-Pala-Manimala - Pathanamthitta-Punalur Road) connects Kanjirappally to other major towns.
Kanjirappally-Manimala road connects Changanassery easily. Chenappady connects Ranni.
A link road that connects Pala directly from Kanjirappally through Thambalakkadu.
Parathanam - Mundakayam - Parathode - Podimattam - 26th Mile - Kanjirappally

The nearest international airport is Cochin International Airport in Nedumbassery, the nearest railway station is in Kottayam, Changanacherry and the nearest KSRTC bus station is in Ponkunnam.

On 19 July 2017, the Kerala Government has announced the construction of the 5th International Airport in Kerala, Sabarigiri International Airport at Cheruvally Estate of Harrisons Plantations at Manimala, Erumely, situated at the Border of Kottayam District and Pathanamthitta district to facilitate travel of Sabarimala pilgrims.

Administration
Kanjirappally assembly constituency is part of Pathanamthitta (Lok Sabha constituency).

Notable people

Education 
Schools and colleges in Kanjirappally:
 St. Antony's Public School, Anakkal
 John Joseph Murphy Memorial Higher Secondary School 
 AKJM (Archbishop Kavukattu Jubilee Memorial) Higher Secondary School
 Alfeen Public School
 Amal Jyothi College of Engineering, Koovappally
 St. Dominic's College

References

External links

 Kanjirappally Official Facebook
Kanjirappally local news on kanjirappallyvarthkal.com
Kanjirappally local news on keralaonline.in
Weather In Kanjirappally

Cities and towns in Kottayam district